The 2021 season was Welsh Fire's first season of the new franchise 100 ball cricket, The Hundred.

Players 
The first players assigned to the Welsh Fire were England women's centrally contracted players Katie George and Bryony Smith, England men's red-ball contracted player Jonny Bairstow, and two "local icons" in Somerset's Tom Banton and Glamorgan's Colin Ingram.

Men's side 
In the initial draft for the men's Hundred on 20 October 2019, Welsh Fire selected Australia internationals Mitchell Starc and Steve Smith as overseas players at the £125,000 salary level, as well as Qais Ahmed at the £60,000 level. Smith was appointed as captain of the team in February 2020. After the Hundred was delayed due to the COVID-19 pandemic, Jonny Bairstow lost his England central contract and was replaced in that capacity at Welsh Fire by Ollie Pope. Smith and Starc were also not retained for the rescheduled competition. Bairstow was ultimately re-signed by the Fire as one of their salary-banded players, and appointed as captain in July 2021.

 Bold denotes players with international caps.

Women's side 
 Bold denotes players with international caps.

Fixtures (Men)

July

August

Fixtures (Women)

July

August

Standings

Women

 advances to the Final
 advances to the Eliminator

Men

 advances to the Final
 advances to the Eliminator

References

Cricket clubs established in 2019
2019 establishments in England
The Hundred (cricket)